Wilfried Nelissen (Tongeren, 5 May 1970) is a former Belgian road racing cyclist, who specialised as a sprinter. He was involved in a crash at the end of stage 1 of the 1994 Tour de France, when he collided with a policeman. The incident also involved French rider Laurent Jalabert. Nelissen retired in 1998 due to a knee injury that he suffered in 1996 after falling during the Gent–Wevelgem race.

Major results

1991
 Tour de Picardie: Final classification, stage 2
 Tour de Luxembourg  Stage 3

1992
 Paris–Bourges: Final classification, stage 2
 Tour de Suisse  Stages 3 and 6
 Critérium du Dauphiné Libéré  Stages 1 and 3
 Ronde van Nederland  Stage 1
 Vuelta a Andalucía  Stage 2

1993
 Omloop Het Volk
 Tour de France  Stage 2, wearing the yellow jersey for three days
 Ronde van Nederland  Stages 1, 2 and 4

1994
 Belgian road cycling champion
 Omloop Het Volk
 Four Days of Dunkirk  Stages 1 and 2
 Étoile de Bessèges  Stages 1 and 3
 Tour Méditerranéen  Stage 2
 Grand Prix d'Isbergues

1995
 Belgian road cycling champion
 Paris–Nice  Stages 1 and 3
 Four Days of Dunkirk  Stage 3
 Ronde van Nederland  Stage 3
 Midi Libre  Stage 2
 Étoile de Bessèges Stages 1, 3 and 5
 Tour de Picardie Stages 1 and 2
 Route du Sud  Stages 1A, 2 and 4

1996
 Paris–Nice  Stage 2
 Étoile de Bessèges Stages 1, 2 and 3

External links

Belgian male cyclists
Belgian Tour de France stage winners
1970 births
Living people
People from Tongeren
Tour de Suisse stage winners
Cyclists from Limburg (Belgium)